The following outline is provided as an overview of and topical guide to semiotics:

Semiotics – study of meaning-making, signs and sign processes (semiosis), indication, designation, likeness, analogy, metaphor, symbolism, signification, and communication. Semiotics is closely related to the field of linguistics, which, for its part, studies the structure and meaning of language more specifically. Also called semiotic studies, or semiology (in the Saussurean tradition).

What type of thing is semiotics? 

Semiotics can be described as all of the following:

 Academic discipline – branch of knowledge that is taught and researched at the college or university level. Disciplines are defined (in part), and recognized by the academic journals in which research is published, and the learned societies and academic departments or faculties to which their practitioners belong.
 Social science – field of study concerned with society and human behaviours.

Branches of semiotics

Three main branches 
 Semantics – relation between signs and the things to which they refer; their denotata, or meaning
 Syntactics – relations among signs in formal structures
 Pragmatics – relation between signs and the effects they have on the people who use them

Subfields 
 Biosemiotics – growing field that studies the production, action and interpretation of signs and codes in the biological realm. Biosemiotics attempts to integrate the findings of scientific biology and semiotics, representing a paradigmatic shift in the occidental scientific view of life, demonstrating that semiosis (sign process, including meaning and interpretation) is its immanent and intrinsic feature.
 Cognitive semiotics – study of meaning-making by employing and integrating methods and theories developed in the cognitive sciences as well as in the human sciences. It involves conceptual and textual analysis as well as experimental and ethnographic investigations.
 Computational semiotics – attempts to engineer the process of semiosis, in the study of and design for Human-Computer Interaction, and mimic aspects of human cognition through artificial intelligence and knowledge representation.
 Cultural semiotics –
 Design semiotics –
 Product semiotics – study of the use of signs in the design of physical products. Introduced by Rune Monö while teaching Industrial Design at the Institute of Design, Umeå University, Sweden.
 Law and semiotics –
 Literary semiotics – approach to literary criticism informed by the theory of signs or semiotics. Semiotics, tied closely to the structuralism pioneered by Ferdinand de Saussure, was extremely influential in the development of literary theory out of the formalist approaches of the early twentieth century.
 Music semiology – "There are strong arguments that music inhabits a semiological realm which, on both ontogenetic and phylogenetic levels, has developmental priority over verbal language." (Middleton 1990, p. 172)  See Nattiez (1976, 1987, 1989), Stefani (1973, 1986), Baroni (1983), and Semiotica (66: 1–3 (1987)).
 Gregorian chant semiology – current avenue of palaeographical research in Gregorian chant which is revising the Solesmes school of interpretation.
 Organisational semiotics – examines the nature, characteristics and features of information, and studies how information can be best used in the context of organised activities and business domains. Organisational semiotics treats organisations as information systems in which information is created, processed, distributed, stored and used.
 Semiotic anthropology – semiotics of Charles Sanders Peirce and Roman Jakobson applied to anthropology.
 Semiotic engineering – views HCI as computer-mediated communication between designers and users at interaction time. The system speaks for its designers in various types of conversations specified at design time. These conversations communicate the designers' understanding of who the users are, what they know the users want or need to do, in which preferred ways, and why.
 Semiotic information theory – considers the information content of signs and expressions as it is conceived within the semiotic or sign-relational framework developed by Charles Sanders Peirce.
 Social semiotics – expands the interpretable semiotic landscape to include all cultural codes, such as in slang, fashion, and advertising. It considers social connotations, including meanings related to ideology and power structures, in addition to denotative meanings of signs.
 Urban semiotics – study of meaning in urban form as generated by signs, symbols, and their social connotations. It focuses on material objects of the built environment, such as streets, squares, parks, and buildings, but also abstract cultural constructs such as building codes, planning documents, unbuilt designs, real estate advertising, and popular discourse about the city, such as architectural criticism and real estate blogs.
 Theatre semiotics – extends or adapts semiotics onstage. Key theoricians include Keir Elam.
 Visual semiotics – analyses visual signs. See also visual rhetoric.
 Zoosemiotics – study of animal meaning-making and communication.

History of semiotics 

 History of semiotics
 Tartu-Moscow Semiotic School – scientific school of thought that was formed in 1964 and led by Juri Lotman. Among the other members of this school were Boris Uspensky, Vyacheslav Ivanov, Vladimir Toporov, Mikhail Gasparov, Alexander Piatigorsky, Isaak I. Revzin, and others. As a result of their collective work, they established a theoretical framework around the semiotics of culture.

Methods of semiotics 
 Commutation test –
 Paradigmatic analysis –
 Syntagmatic analysis –

Semiotic analyses 
 Semiotic democracy
 Semiotic elements and classes of signs
 Semiotics of agriculture
 Semiotics of dress
 Semiotics of interactive media
 Semiotics of music videos
 Semiotics of photography
 Semiotics of social networking
 Semiotics of wrestling characters

General semiotics concepts 

 Biosemiotics –
 Code –
 Computational semiotics –
 Connotation –
 Decode –
 Denotation –
 Encode –
 Lexical –
 Literary semiotics –
 Modality –
 Representation (arts) –
 Salience –
 Semeiotic –
 Semiosis –
 Semiotic square –
 Semiosphere –
 Semiotic elements & sign classes –
 Sign –
 Sign relational complex –
 Sign relation –
 Umwelt –
 Value –

Semiotics organizations 
 International Association for Semiotic Studies
 International Association for the Semiotics of Law
 International Society for Biosemiotic Studies
 Semiotic Society of America

Semiotics publications 
 The American Journal of Semiotics
 Elements of Semiology
 Semiotica
 Semiotics: The Proceedings of the Semiotic Society of America
 Sign Systems Studies
 Versus

Persons influential in semiotics 

 Mikhail Bakhtin –
 Roland Barthes –
 Marcel Danesi –
 John Deely –
 Umberto Eco –
 Algirdas Julien Greimas –
 Félix Guattari –
 Louis Hjelmslev –
 Vyacheslav Ivanov –
 Roman Jakobson –
 Roberta Kevelson –
 Kalevi Kull –
 Juri Lotman –
 Charles S. Peirce –
 Augusto Ponzio –
 Ferdinand de Saussure –
 Thomas Sebeok –
 Michael Silverstein –
 Eero Tarasti –
 Vladimir Toporov –
 Jakob von Uexküll –

Cognitive semioticians 
 Per Aage Brandt –
 Peer Bundgård –
 Riccardo Fusaroli –
 Svend Østergaard –
 Frederik Stjernfelt –
 Kristian Tylén –
 Mikkel Wallentin –
 Jordan Zlatev –

Literary semioticians 
 Roland Barthes – 
 Marcel Danesi – 
 Juri Lotman –

Social semioticians 
 Roland Barthes –
 Michael Halliday –
 Bob Hodge –
 Christian Metz –
 Virginia Valentine

See also 

 Structuralism
 Post-structuralism
 Aestheticization of violence
 Postmodernity

References

External links 

 Applied Semiotics / Sémiotique appliquée
 Communicology: The link between semiotics and phenomenological manifestations
 Signo — www.signosemio.com — Presents semiotic theories and theories closely related to semiotics
 The Semiotics of the Web

Peircean focus
 Arisbe: The Peirce Gateway
 Minute Semeiotic, English, Portuguese
 Peirce's Theory of Semiosis: Toward a Logic of Mutual Affection — free online course
 Semiotics according to Robert Marty, with 76 definitions of the sign by C. S. Peirce
 The Commens Dictionary of Peirce's Terms

Journals, book series — associations, centers
 American Journal of Semiotics, Joseph Brent, Editor, & John Deely, Managing Editor—from the Semiotic Society of America.
 Applied Semiotics / Sémiotique appliquée (AS/SA), Peter G. Marteinson & Pascal G. Michelucci, Editors.
 Approaches to Applied Semiotics (2000–2009 book series), Thomas Sebeok et al., Editors.
 Approaches to Semiotics (1969–97 book series), Thomas A. Sebeok, Alain Rey, Roland Posner, et al., Editors.
 Biosemiotics, Marcello Barbieri, Editor-in-Chief—from the International Society for Biosemiotic Studies.
 Center for Semiotics, Aarhus University, Denmark.
 Cognitive Semiotics, Per Aage Brandt & Todd Oakley, Editors-in-Chief. 
 Cybernetics and Human Knowing, Søren Brier, Chief Editor.
 International Journal of Signs and Semiotic Systems (IJSSS), Angelo Loula & João Queiroz, Editors.
 Open Semiotics Resource Center. Journals, lecture courses, etc.
 The Public Journal of Semiotics, Paul Bouissac, Editor in Chief; Alan Cienki, Associate Editor; René Jorna, Winfried Nöth. 
 S.E.E.D. Journal (Semiotics, Evolution, Energy, and Development) (2001–7), Edwina Taborsky, Editor—from SEE.
 The Semiotic Review of Books, Gary Genosko, General Editor; Paul Bouissac, Founding Editor.
 Semiotica, Marcel Danesi, Chief Editor—from the International Association for Semiotic Studies.
 Semiotiche, Gian Paolo Caprettini, Managing Director; Andrea Valle & Miriam Visalli, Editors. Some articles in English. Home site seems gone from Web, old url  no longer good, and Wayback Machine cannot retrieve. 
 Semiotics, Communication and Cognition (book series), Paul Cobley & Kalevi Kull, Editors. 
 SemiotiX New Series: A Global Information Bulletin, Paul Bouissac et al. 
 Sign Systems Studies, Kalevi Kull, Kati Lindstrom, Mihhail Lotman, Timo Maran, Silvi Salupere, Peeter Torop, Editors—from the Dept. of Semiotics, U. of Tartu, Estonia.
 Signs and Society, Richard J. Parmentier, Editor.
 Signs: International Journal of Semiotics. Martin Thellefsen, Torkild Thellefsen, & Bent Sørensen, chief eds.
 Tartu Semiotics Library (book series), Peeter Torop, Kalevi Kull, Silvi Salupere, Editors.  
 Transactions of the Charles S. Peirce Society, Cornelis de Waal, Chief Editor—from The Charles S. Peirce Society.
 Versus: Quaderni di studi semiotici, founded by Umberto Eco.

Sefxzdhnn vvmiotics
Semiotics